Melaka Gateway was an off-shore development of artificial islands in Malacca, Malaysia. It was launched on 7 February 2014 by Malaysia's Prime Minister, Dato' Seri Najib Bin Tun Abdul Razak, witnessed by Malacca Chief Minister Idris Haron. It was expected to be open in 2018 and finished completely by 2025. In November 2020, the project was reported as scrapped by the State government stating that the developer of the Melaka Gateway project has failed to complete the reclamation works after three years as contracted. Malaccan Chief Minister Sulaiman Md Ali was quoted as saying the Melaka Gateway project will not be abandoned but will be taken over by a new developer saying "The development will continue, but we have some technical issues that we need to fix." KAJ Development Sdn Bhd (KAJD) was the developer of the project.

Reactions
In 2017, Chief Minister of Malacca, Idris Haron said he was serious in developing the state into a nautical gem of this region and could no longer tolerate any hiatus in proposed development projects laid by interested developers. The Kristang community at the Portuguese Settlement however said that they were not consulted by this project. The Portuguese community has been protesting the project ever since they found out about it. In May 2018, 200 villagers participated in a demonstration outside of the KAJ Development's office.

China's then-Minister of Transport, H.E. Yang Chuantang said: "With Malacca as the forefront flagship in support of the One Belt, One Road program initiated by the People's Republic of China, we will soon taste the fruits of success, especially with the plans for infrastructure,...China is confident in Melaka Gateway's project."

Forbes described Malaysian Prime Minister Mahathir Mohamad as the "strongest opponent of Melaka Gateway". Mahathir said of the project "We are very concerned because in the first place we don’t need any extra harbor."

The chief executive of KAJ reacted to the cancellation saying that KAJ were contemplating taking legal action against the state saying "We are left with no choice. Our project is canceled after we spent millions of our own resources to conduct various environmental studies and pay licensing fees." In December 2020, the company filed a judicial review challenging the termination notice issued by the Malacca State Government. In February 2021, the judicial review was dismissed by the court.

See also
 Arab City Melaka
 Megaprojects
 Malacca Island
 Forest City, Johor

External links

References

Artificial islands of Asia
Islands of Malacca